Tsaplin (from цапля meaning heron) is a Russian masculine surname, its feminine counterpart is Tsaplina. Notable people with the surname include:

Andrei Tsaplin (born 1977), Russian footballer

Russian-language surnames